The 2013 Challenge Trophy was hosted in Halifax, Nova Scotia. In the final Glouchester Celtic (Ontario) defeated Surrey United Firefighters (British Columbia).

Teams

  Gloucester Celtic
  Surrey United Firefighters
  Edmonton Scottish
  Winnipeg Lions
  Fredericton Wanderers
  St. Lawrence Laurentians
  Sherwood-Parkdale Rangers SC
  Royal Select de Beauport (2012 champion)
  HUSA Alumni
  Yellowknife FC
  Halifax City
  Halifax Dunbrack (2)

Results

References

Challenge
Canadian National Challenge Cup